Gulf Road is a major coastal road located in the Eastern Province of Saudi Arabia linking the two cities of Dammam and Qatif via smaller cities such as Saihat and Enak.

The road is 26 kilometers long (16 miles) with plans to extend it further to the south. It is 40 metres wide with eight roundabouts, with one claimed as the largest roundabout in the world with a diameter of 150 metres located between Dammam and Saihat. The road is directly connected with Dhahran-Jubail Highway by two roads, one of them is Uhod Road in the city center of Qatif and the other is the 15th Street in Saihat.

The road is high traffic most of the time. Malls on the road include Al-Shatea Mall, Marina Mall and Darine Mall.

The speed limit is 80 km/h (50 Mph)

See also
 Transport in Saudi Arabia

References

Roads in Saudi Arabia
Transport in Dammam